A podcast client, or podcatcher, is a computer program used to stream or download podcasts, usually via an RSS or XML feed.

While podcast clients are best known for streaming and downloading podcasts, many are also capable of downloading video, newsfeeds, text, and pictures. Some of these podcast clients can also automate the transfer of received audio files to a portable media player. Although many include a directory of high-profile podcasts, they generally allow users to manually subscribe directly to a feed by providing the URL.

The core concepts had been developing since 2000, the first commercial podcast client software was developed in 2001.

Podcasts were made popular when Apple added podcatching to its iTunes software and iPod portable media player in June 2005. Apple Podcasts is currently included in all Apple devices, such as iPhone, iPad and Mac computers.

Podcast clients

See also 
 Comparison of audio player software

References

External links 
 "Podcast Software (Clients)" at podcastingnews.com – Archived page 
 podcatchermatrix.org compares the features of a number of podcast clients.
 "Podcast Client Feature Comparison Matrix" as a Google Sheets spreadsheet.

Podcasting software
Podcast clients
Podcasting lists